Robbie Lawlor (died 4 April 2020) was an Irish criminal. He was originally from Dublin, but had lived in County Meath and was heavily involved in organised crime, including the Drogheda feud.

He was well known to Gardaí for being involved in serious and organised crime. He was a suspect in the murders of Kenneth Finn and David Lynch among other crimes. He had over 100 convictions and had been released from prison in December 2019. He had been warned by Gardaí that his life was in danger before he went to Belfast.he was set up by The Dundon Gang

Mugging
He was mugged after leaving a gym in December 2019, which was filmed by his assailants, suspected to include Keane Mulready Woods, a teenager involved with the rival gang who would be subsequently lured to a brutal and horrific death suspected to have been ordered at the hands of Lawlor. During this daylight assault on Lawlor, the assailants stole his gym bag and flip-flops and posted photos of them wearing the latter  after the mugging. The assault was allegedly at the behest of a criminal foe of Lawlor. In ruthless revenge the teenagers head and hands were severed from the body, and bags with body parts left in rivals turf in holdalls. The presence of flip-flops also in the bag of Keane Mulready-Woods remains dumped in Coolock was widely interpreted as a threat not to cross Lawlor.

Death
On 4 April 2020, he was shot around 11:50am outside a house in Etna Drive, Ardoyne in north Belfast. The PSNI and Garda Síochána believe he had travelled to Belfast in the hours before he was shot, possibly to collect debts. As well as being a suspect in the death of Keane Mulready-Woods he was suspected of being responsible for a number of other killings. He had been threatened by one faction in the Drogheda feud but was also at odds with a major Dublin criminal who is suspected of several murders including that of Alan Ryan. Three men suspected of the murder were arrested and questioned by the PSNI at Musgrave police station.

Three suspects were arrested on Saturday, a fourth was arrested on Sunday.

The shooting was condemned by Detective Sergeant Jason Murphy, as a murder, as a danger to the local community and due to the additional pressures caused by coronavirus pandemic. The shooting was also condemned by Minister for Justice Naomi Long and Sinn Féin MLA Gerry Kelly.

The PSNI suspect that a single gunman shot Lawlor.

Charges brought
In December 2020 two men, one from Derry and one from Belfast, were charged with his murder. Both were also charged with possession of a 9mm pistol with intent to endanger life.

They appeared via videolink and spoke only to confirm that they understood the charges. They were remanded in custody, to appear before the court by videolink again on 8 January 2021.

References

Irish gangsters
2020 deaths
Deaths by firearm
Criminals from Dublin (city)